Battle of Laagna (18 January 1919) took place in Laagna, Estonia, during the Estonian War of Independence with Estonian mariners and Finnish volunteers against the Red Army.

In the morning the Estonians and Finns took Laagna village with a surprise attack and pushed the Red Army out. Against the Estonian mariners and Finnish volunteers (220 men altogether) were two regiments of Red Army infantry, two armoured trains and some cavalry units. The Soviets repeatedly attacked the Estonian and Finnish positions with armored trains but were unable to capture Laagna and were driven back with heavy losses. The Estonian Marines and Finns lost four troops killed, 21 wounded and three captured.

References 

Battles of the Estonian War of Independence
Ida-Viru County
1919 in Estonia
January 1919 events